Furcraea cabuya is a species of plant in the family Asparagaceae that is native to South America. The fibres in its leaves, known as fique, are used in making ropes.

References

cabuya
Flora of the Andes
Flora of Colombia
Flora of Ecuador
Flora of Peru
Crops originating from South America
Garden plants of South America
Plants described in 1910
Taxa named by William Trelease